Crocosaurus Cove is a crocodile (and other reptile) herpetarium and aquarium zoo located in an indoor complex in the city district of Darwin, Northern Territory, Australia. Its main focus as the facility's name indicates is the tourism drawcard of the crocodiles of northern Australia. The park has a considerable number of saltwater crocodiles including 700kg and 5.1 metre long male Burt, who appeared in 1986 movie Crocodile Dundee and made news in 2018 for 'psychic predictions' outcomes of the 2018 Soccer World Cup by reaching up and grabbing photographs of players which was seen as match and player performance 'predicting'. The facility has also had success with breeding and hatching baby crocodiles including in July 2022 with baby crocodiles hatched to parent crocodiles female Kate and male William. One of the things most well known at the facility which significantly increased visitor numbers is a 'cage of death' experience where paying visitors can swim in water with large crocodiles while protected from physical contact with them by being enclosed behind a glass safety dome. As previously mentioned a significant number of other native Australian reptiles (and a small number of amphibians and fish) are also kept at the facility and publicly exhibited. Mick Burns the owner is also owner of Darwin Crocodile Farm.

The species kept and displayed at the facility are listed below.

Reptiles
(Crocodiles)
Freshwater crocodile
Saltwater crocodile
(Lizards)

Black-headed monitor
Centralian blue-tongued skink
Centralian knob-tailed gecko
Centralian tree-dragon
Frilled lizard
Fringe-toed velvet gecko
Giant cave gecko
Hosmer's skink
Inland bearded-dragon
Jewelled velvet-gecko
Lace monitor
Leopard skink
Long-nosed water dragon
Marbled velvet gecko
Merten's water monitor
Northern blue-tongued skink
Northern spiny-tailed gecko
Perentie
Pygmy mulga monitor
Rusty monitor
Sand goanna
Spencer's monitor
Spiny-tailed monitor
Stokes's skink
Storr's monitor
Western blue-tongued skink
Yellow-throated monitor

(Snakes)

Black-headed python
Bredl's carpet python
Children's python
Coastal taipan
Eastern brown snake
Inland taipan
King brown snake
Northern carpet python
Northern death adder
Oenpelli python
Olive python
Pygmy mulga snake
Rough-scaled python
Slaty-grey snake
Stimson's python
Water python
Western brown snake
Woma python

(Turtles)

Arnhem Land long-necked turtle
Northern long-necked turtle
Northern red-faced turtle
Northern snapping turtle
Northern yellow-faced turtle
Pig-nosed turtle
Victoria River turtle

Amphibians
Cane toad
Green tree frog
Magnificent tree frog

Fish

Banded rainbowfish
Barramundi
Black catfish
Blackmast
Butler's grunter
Chequered rainbowfish
Common archerfish
Fly-specked hardyhead
Freshwater sawfish
Freshwater whipray
Gulf saratoga
Indo-Pacific tarpon
Mangrove jack
Silver cobbler
Sooty grunter
Spotted scat

References

External links

2008 establishments in Australia
Zoos established in 2008
Zoos in the Northern Territory
Tourist attractions in Darwin, Northern Territory
Aquaria in Australia